Kathleen Krekels (born 5 June, 1968 in Deurne) is a Belgian-Flemish politician for the New Flemish Alliance (N-VA).

Krekels has been a municipal councilor in Schilde since 2013 and since 2018 has been the alderman for the town. Since 2014, she has served as a member of the Flemish Parliament where she focuses on matters related to education and sits with the Education Committee.

References

Living people
1968 births
Members of the Flemish Parliament
New Flemish Alliance politicians
21st-century Belgian women politicians
21st-century Belgian politicians